The Tjeraridjal are an indigenous people of the Goldfields-Esperance region of Western Australia. Horton treats them as synonymous with the Nyanganyatjara, or it may be that they speak the same dialect of the Western Desert Language.

Country
At Munuruna/Queen Victoria Spring. Their western borders lay around Kurnalpi and the areas of Lake Yindarlgooda,Piniin, and Karonie. To the east, it extended to the vicinity of Naretha on the margins of the Nullarbor Plain. In native terms, their northeastern limits were designated as being at Kapi Kirkela and Tjikarunja.

Of the ecological transition on the eastern boundary Tindale writes:-
'the eastern boundary of the Tjeraridjal, near Naretha, is strongly emphasized by the change from sclerophyll  forests of mallee and gimlet to myall and bulloak which mark the transition to the vast karst treeless plateau of the Nullarbor Plain.'

Notes

Citations

Sources

Aboriginal peoples of Western Australia